Blepharidachne kingii is a species of grass known by the common name King's eyelashgrass. It is native to the Great Basin in the United States, where it grows in habitat such as pinyon-juniper woodland. It is rare in California and Idaho, but it is one of the most common grasses of the northeastern deserts of Nevada.

Description
Blepharidachne kingii is a perennial bunchgrass growing in clumps or mats of stems 3 to 14 centimeters tall. The curved, twisted, stiff, hairlike leaf blades are up to 3 centimeters long. The inflorescence is a purplish to straw-colored panicle of finely hairy spikelets.

Common associates in the flora of the plant's basin and desert habitat include saltbush, winterfat, creosote bush, ragweed, greasewood, hopsage, and boxthorn.

References

External links
 Calflora Database: Blepharidachne kingii (King's eyelash grass)
USDA Plants Profile for Blepharidachne kingii (King's eyelashgrass)
 Jepson Manual eFlora treatment of Blepharidachne kingii
UC CalPhotos gallery of Blepharidachne kingii images

Chloridoideae
Bunchgrasses of North America
Grasses of the United States
Native grasses of California
Flora of the California desert regions
Flora of the Great Basin
Endemic flora of the United States
Natural history of the Mojave Desert
Natural history of Inyo County, California
Least concern flora of the United States
Taxa named by Sereno Watson
Taxa named by Eduard Hackel